The Sugimoto Art Museum (杉本美術館) features the work of the Japanese painter Kenkichi Sugimoto (1905-2004) and is located in Mihama, Chita District, Aichi Prefecture, Japan. The museum is operated by the Meitetsu railway company.

See also
 List of single-artist museums

External links 
 Homepage of the Sugimoto Art Museum

Meitetsu Group
Art museums and galleries in Aichi Prefecture
Mihama, Aichi
1978 establishments in Japan
Art museums established in 1978